James Ronald Zazzali (born June 17, 1937) is an American jurist who served as Chief Justice of the New Jersey Supreme Court from October 26, 2006, until his retirement on June 17, 2007. He previously served as an associate justice of the Supreme Court from June 14, 2000.

Biography
Zazzali was born in Newark, New Jersey on June 17, 1937 of Italian descent. He studied at Seton Hall Preparatory School, and later graduated with a B.S. from Georgetown College in 1958 and was awarded a J.D. from Georgetown University Law Center. After graduation, he was admitted into the bars of New Jersey, New York, and the District of Columbia.

Zazzali served as the Chief of the Appeals Division in the Office of the Essex County Prosecutor. He also served as the General Counsel to the New Jersey Sports and Exposition Authority and was a receiver for Bloomfield College. He went on to become the Chairman of the New Jersey State Commission of Investigation, the Vice-Chairman of the Disciplinary Review Board, and served as New Jersey Attorney General from 1981-1982. He was also appointed as Special Master for county jails in Essex, Monmouth, and Bergen counties. He also served on delegations to certain United Nations conferences.

Zazzali was nominated by Governor Christine Todd Whitman for the position of justice to the NJ Supreme Court on May 18, 2000, and was confirmed on May 25, 2000. He was officially sworn into the position by then-Chief Justice Deborah T. Poritz.  In September 2006, with Poritz nearing mandatory retirement age, Governor Jon Corzine nominated Zazzali for promotion to chief justice.

Zazzali was sworn in as Chief Justice on October 26, 2006. He left the court upon reaching the mandatory retirement age of 70 on June 17, 2007 and was replaced by then-Attorney General Stuart Rabner.

Zazzali is married to Eileen Fitzsimmons and has five children: Mara; James, Jr., Robert; Courtney; and Kevin. He has been a resident of Rumson, New Jersey.

References

1937 births
Living people
Chief Justices of the Supreme Court of New Jersey
Georgetown College (Georgetown University) alumni
New Jersey Attorneys General
Georgetown University Law Center alumni
Politicians from Newark, New Jersey
People from Rumson, New Jersey
Seton Hall Preparatory School alumni
New Jersey Democrats
American people of Italian descent
Lawyers from Newark, New Jersey